Collin McCamy (born May 16, 2003) is an American soccer player who plays as a midfielder for USL Championship club North Carolina FC.

Club career
Born in Wake Forest, North Carolina, McCamy began his career with Triangle Futbol Club Alliance in 2015 and stayed there till 2017. In 2017, McCamy joined the youth setup at United Soccer League club North Carolina FC. On July 16, 2020, McCamy signed a USL academy contract with the North Carolina FC first team, allowing him to play professionally while maintaining NCAA eligibility. The next day, McCamy appeared on the bench for North Carolina FC against the Tampa Bay Rowdies but didn't get onto the pitch.

On July 1, 2021, it was announced that McCamy had committed to playing college soccer for the Northwestern University as part of the incoming class of 2021. In March 2021, McCamy signed another USL academy deal with North Carolina FC for the 2021 season. On May 15, 2021, a day before his 18th birthday, McCamy made his senior debut for North Carolina FC against Forward Madison, coming on as a late substitute in the 1–0 defeat.

Career statistics

References

External links
 Profile at North Carolina FC

2003 births
Living people
Sportspeople from North Carolina
American soccer players
Association football defenders
North Carolina FC players
USL League One players
Soccer players from North Carolina
21st-century American people